Adolf Ludwig Cluss (July 14, 1825 – July 24, 1905) also known as Adolph Cluss was a German-born American immigrant who became one of the most important, influential and prolific architects in Washington, D.C., in the late 19th century, responsible for the design of numerous schools and other notable public buildings in the capital. Today, several of his buildings are still standing. He was also a City Engineer and a Building Inspector for the Board of Public Works.

Red brick was Cluss' favorite building material; that, and his early communist sympathies, led some to dub him the "Red Architect", though he was a man who in later life became a confirmed Republican.

Life

He was born on July 24, 1825, in Heilbronn in the Kingdom of Württemberg in Southwest Germany. He was the fifth child of Johann Heinrich Abraham Cluss (1792–1857) and Anna Christine Neuz (1796–1827). His father was a master builder, and young Cluss set out as an itinerant carpenter when he left Heilbronn at age nineteen. In his travels, he met and became a friend of Karl Marx and a supporter of communist principles at a time of political and revolutionary ferment in Germany. He joined the Communist League and became a member of the Mainz Worker Council. The failure of the German revolutionary movement in 1848 led him to leave Germany when he was twenty-three, along with other Forty-Eighters who emigrated to the United States at that time. In the United States, he continued his political activity into the 1850s, maintaining an extensive correspondence with Marx and Engels and writing and publishing political articles for the German-American community.

Early life in America

Adolf Cluss immigrated to the United-States in 1848 at the age of 23. He crossed the Atlantic on board the Zürich, a small sailing ship from Le Havre, France to New York City. He spent the first six months in New York City where he perfected his English. He looked for work in Philadelphia, Baltimore and finally settled in Washington, D.C., in the 1849. In the summer of 1849, he started working for the U.S. Coast Survey as a technical draftsman surveying the Maryland and Virginia coastlines. The following year, we worked at the Washington Navy Yard designing various project for the Ordnance Department. He did not like this position or his life in the city and considered going back to Europe. He considered becoming a bookseller in 1852, requesting funds from his father who did not provide the funds. In 1855, he became a US citizen and transferred to the US Treasury Department as a technical draftsman. He became an abolitionist sometime after that time.

He briefly returned to Europe in 1859 to receive his share of the inheritance this father had left him when he died in 1857 and returned to Philadelphia. He attempted to become a brewer with a friend but the business soon failed and we was back to his old position in the Ordnance Department at the Washington Navy Yard working closely with Admiral John A. Dahlgren.

Private practice
Adolf Cluss started his private practice in 1862. While America was torn apart in the Civil War and while still working at the Navy Yard, Cluss started an architectural office with another German immigrant Josef Wildrich von Kammerhueber. He continued to work full-time at the Navy Yard until the following year and part-time as an architect. His partner was working full-time from Cluss' house on 2nd Street, NW. In 1864, their breakthrough was the Wallach School. Adolf Cluss was 39 years old.

Cluss and Kammerhueber were also civil engineers as many architects at the time. In 1864, the City of Washington requested Cluss and Kammerhueber to write a report on the Washington City Canal and the sewer system. This report led to the Canal being finally covered over in 1871 which had become an open sewer on the National Mall. The partnership ended in 1868. He became an active member of the American Institute of Architects in 1867.

Board of Public Works
Cluss maintained his solo private practice but became a Building Inspector for the Board of Public Works in Washington, DC. The Board was the most powerful entity in the city. Cluss wrote building regulations and was a major proponent of the use of building permits and inspections. On October 18, 1872, he was appointed by President Ulysses S. Grant as a member of the Board of Public Works and City Engineer. This came at the recommendation of Governor Cooke, Alexander "Boss" Shepherd and his predecessor Alfred B. Mullett.

Cluss had become a member of the local Republican party by then and had led a volunteer committee of local Republicans coordinating parts of the President's inauguration after having been re-elected that same year. He also volunteered in President James A. Garfield's inauguration committee in 1880.

The Board had been working to improve the city by paving and grading roads, adding sewers and planting trees but there was a cost associated with this. The expenditures by the Board of Public Works led the city to be on the brink of bankruptcy. Adolf Cluss testified before a Joint Committee in May 1874. His appointment was revoked by the President on May 25, 1874. Congress to pass legislation on June 30, 1874, abolishing the territorial government and replacing it with the three-member Board of Commissioners.

Return to private practice
In 1877, he partnered with architect Frederick Daniel with an office at 701 15th Street, NW but the partnership came to an end in 1878. The following year, he started working with architect Paul Schulze. The partnership came to an end in 1889 when Cluss retired from his private practice having built almost 90 buildings including at least eleven schools, as well as markets, government buildings, museums, residences and churches. Cluss' schoolhouse designs were particularly innovative and influential, though only two of his red-brick school masterpieces remain, Franklin School and Sumner School in downtown Washington. The Franklin School was completed in 1869 earning the Washington public school system a Medal for Progress.  He designed four major buildings on the National Mall, including the still-standing Smithsonian Arts and Industries Building. He built six houses of worship including Calvary Baptist Church which still stands.

Two of the city's largest food markets, Center Market (1872) and Eastern Market (1873), were built to his design. The first was torn down in 1931 to be replaced by the National Archives Building. The second is still standing having surviving a fire in 2007. His flagship store for Lansburgh's opened in 1882.

Cluss was also active as a builder of mansions for the Washington elite, such as Stewart's Castle on Dupont Circle. In 1880, he was hired to create what became Washington's first luxury apartment building, Portland Flats, an ornate, six-floor, 39-unit creation on the south side of Thomas Circle. Almost all of Cluss' residential creations have been demolished—Portland Flats, for instance, was torn down in 1962 to make way for an office building.

In 1877, he was commission to oversee the reconstruction of the Old Patent Office Building (today the National Portrait Gallery) in Washington, D.C.

American Institute of Architects involvement
Adolf Cluss was an active member of the American Institute of Architects. He became a fellow of the Institute in 1876.

He also attended several conventions over the years:
 21st Annual Convention of the American Institute of Architects – October 19 to October 21, 1887, in Chicago, IL.
 22nd Annual Convention of the American Institute of Architects – October 17 to October 19, 1888, in Buffalo, New York, during which he presented a paper: Mortars and Concretes of Antiquity and Modern Times. He attended the conversation with some of his daughters as reported by the transcript of the convention.
 24nd Annual Convention of the American Institute of Architects – October 22, 1890, in Washington, DC.
 25th Annual Convention of the American Institute of Architects – October 28, 1891, in Boston, MA
 32nd Annual Convention of the American Institute of Architects – November 1, 1898, in Washington, D.C. Presented a communication on Acoustics.

He was one of the founding members of the Washington, D.C., chapter in 1887. He attended Annual Meetings of the Washington Chapter including the January 7, 1898, meeting.

In 1889, he was elected for one year as a member of the Board of Directors of the American Institute of Architects.

Inspector of Federal Buildings
He became an Inspector of Federal Buildings in the Office of the Supervising Architect under the United States Department of the Treasury in 1889 after closing his private office in June of that year. He inspected the Ellis Island buildings in February 1892 and wrote a report on July 15, 1892, a few months after the first Immigration Station opened. He testified in front of the House Committee on Immigration and Naturalization on how the humidity was a concern in the building only a few months after it was built. He also inspected many other buildings around the country including the Post Office designed by Alfred B. Mullet in Chicago.

On September 1, 1894, a few months after the death of his wife and after the victory by the Democrats, he was asked for his resignation by Secretary of the Treasury John G. Carlisle. He had solicited letters of support from several prominent people but was replaced by a Democrat.

Personal life

On February 8, 1859, he married Rosa Schmidt (1835–1894) at Zion Lutheran Church in Baltimore, Maryland. They lived in a row house at 413 2nd Street, NW between D Street, NW and E Street, NW for thirty-five years. They raised seven children in that house.
 Lillian Cluss: She was born on January 2, 1860. She had married William Daw and lived above the Daw's pharmacy at 23rd and H Street NW. She died on February 16, 1935.
 Anita T. Cluss: She was born on September in 6, 1861. She was a harpist at St. John's Church and in the Georgetown Orchestra. She died on November 25, 1917.
 Adolph S. Cluss: He was born on January 29, 1863. He worked as a clerk for his father. He died in 1886 at the age of 23 of typhoid fever.
 Carl Louis Cluss: He was born on August 14, 1865. He worked as pharmacist. He died 1894 (6 months after his mother) of typhoid fever at the age of 29.
 Flora Maude Cluss: she was born in December 1870. She married Henry S. Lathrop (of New York) on January 21, 1901, and then moved to New York. She died around 1953.
 Robert Cluss: He was born on November 4, 1873. He died in April 1893 at the age of 19 of tuberculosis.
 Richard Basil Cluss: He was born on September 30, 1875.

His wife died on April 10, 1894 a year after her son Robert of a lengthy respiratory illness. Following the death of Robert, Carl and Rosa Schmidt, Flora and Anita moved to their sister Lillian's house.

As published in the Evening Star on March 18, 1897, Cluss was on the Delinquent District of Columbia Real Estate Tax List owing $8.41 as of July 1, 1896.

In the spring and summer of 1898, Cluss traveled to Germany, Italy and Central Europe and visited his older sister's (Caroline De Millas née Cluss) family in Heidelberg, Germany.

Adolf Cluss died on July 24, 1905, in Washington, D.C., at the age of 80 years. He is buried in Oak Hill Cemetery (Plot: Van Ness, Lot 161 East).

Interviews and publications
 November 13, 1872: Our Modes of Building – Evening Star. Opinion of Architect Cluss on mansard roofs and the risque of fire following the Great Boston fire of 1872.
 May 1875:  Modern Street – Pavements – Popular Science Monthly.
 October 1876: Architecture and Architects at the Capital of the United States from its Foundation until 1875 – The American Architect and Building News (Supplement) presented at the Tenth Annual Convention of the American Institute of Architects on October 11, 1876, in Philadelphia, PA.
 October 1888: Mortars and Concretes of Antiquity and Modern Times – The Inland Architect and News Record (October 1888), Building Budget (October 1888) and Building (November 10, 1888). Presented but not read at the 22nd Annual Convention of the American Institute of Architects in Buffalo, NY from October 17 to October 19, 1888.
 November 1898: Professor W. C. Sabine of Harvard University presented a paper title Acoustics followed by a communication by Adolf Cluss at the 32nd Annual Convention of the American Institute of Architects in Washington, DC.

Legacy
Today, several buildings designed and built by Adolf Cluss still stand in the Washington, D.C., area:
 Calvary Baptist Church
 Eastern Market
 Franklin School
 Sumner School
 Metropolitan Hook & Ladder Company Fire Engine House – 438 Massachusetts Avenue, NW
 Smithsonian Institution, Arts and Industries Building
 Masonic Temple
 Alexandria City Hall

In 2005, after a ceremonial resolution by the DC Council, DC Mayor Anthony A. Williams made a proclamation that 2005 would be "Adolf Cluss Year" from July 2005 to June 2006. Joint exhibitions would be presented in Washington, D.C., at the Charles Sumner School Museum and at the Stadtarchiv in his birthplace of Heilbronn, Germany. Both exhibits closed but a website remains: Adolf-Cluss.org

A small street in Washington, D.C., was named in his honor: Adolf Cluss Court. It connects C St SE to D St SE between 12th Street SE and 13th St SE. 

Buildings
A descriptive list of Cluss's known buildings and an interactive map showing their locations can be found here.

While Adolf Cluss designed and built close to 90 different buildings in his career, few survive today. In green are the buildings still standing today.

Churches

Markets

Schools

Federal buildings

Military commissions

Local governments

Hospitals and homes

Museums

Commercial and office buildings

Hotels and boarding houses

Halls

Residential

Others

Construction oversight
Adolf Cluss took some projects as a builder (general contractor) designed by other architects.

Notes

External links

 Adolf Cluss, An International Exhibition Project
 Goethe-Institut in Washington, DC: Notes on Adolf Cluss
 Washington Post: "Red Architect" Adolf Cluss
 "Adolf Cluss (1825-1905), Architect: From Germany to America", Goethe Institute newsletter, June 2009
 http://www.adolf-cluss.org/

1825 births
1905 deaths
American communists
German-American Forty-Eighters
19th-century German architects
German communists
Architects from Washington, D.C.
People of Washington, D.C., in the American Civil War
19th-century American architects
People from Heilbronn
Washington, D.C., Republicans
Burials at Oak Hill Cemetery (Washington, D.C.)
Washington, D.C., government officials
Washington, D.C., in the American Civil War
Fellows of the American Institute of Architects